Statik Kxng is the eponymous debut studio album by American hip hop duo Statik Kxng, consisting of Statik Selektah and Kxng Crooked. The album was released on February 12, 2016, through Penalty Entertainment and Showoff Records. The album features only one guest appearance from Termanology, who is in the group 1982 with Statik Selektah as well as being signed to Statik's label Showoff Records.

Track listing
All tracks are produced by Statik Selektah.

References

2016 albums
Statik Selektah albums
Albums produced by Statik Selektah
Crooked I albums
Collaborative albums